Sandy Nicholas Stuvik (born 11 April 1995), also referred to as Sandy Kraokaew Stuvik, is a Thai racing driver.

Career

Karting
Born in Phuket to a Norwegian father, Martin Stuvik, and a Thai mother. Stuvik began karting in 2002 in the local karting championships. He progressed to the Rotax Max Junior category by 2008, continuing to compete in local karting championships.

Formula Renault
In 2010, Stuvik moved into open-wheel racing, competing in the Asian Formula Renault Challenge with the Asia Racing Team. He finished every race of the season on the podium, including four wins, and clinched the championship title. He also won the series' Winter Cup.

Stuvik moved to Europe in 2011, joining KEO Racing for Eurocup Formula Renault 2.0. He finished 28th, without scoring a point. He also competed in two rounds of the Formula Renault 2.0 Northern European Cup.

For the next year Stuvik concentrated on the Northern European Cup. He had fourteen point-scoring finishes in twenty races on his way to fourteenth position in the series standings.

Euroformula Open
Stuvik graduated to the European F3 Open Championship, with RP Motorsport, in 2013. He finished every race of the season in the top five. He battled with Ed Jones for the title, but due to dropped points he finished as runner-up.

Stuvik remained in the series, now renamed as the Euroformula Open Championship, with RP Motorsport. He dominated the championship, winning ten out of fourteen races, and clinched the championship with a round to spare.

GP3 Series
In 2015, Stuvik will move up to GP3 with Status Grand Prix.

Racing record

Career summary

Complete GP3 Series results
(key) (Races in bold indicate pole position) (Races in italics indicate fastest lap)

† Driver did not finish the race, but was classified as he completed over 90% of the race distance.

References

External links

1995 births
Living people
Sandy Stuvik
Sandy Stuvik
Formula Renault 2.0 NEC drivers
Formula Renault Eurocup drivers
Euroformula Open Championship drivers
Thai GP3 Series drivers
Sandy Stuvik
Formula 4 drivers
Asian Formula Renault Challenge drivers
Asia Racing Team drivers
RP Motorsport drivers
Status Grand Prix drivers
Trident Racing drivers
Euronova Racing drivers
Team Meritus drivers
Craft-Bamboo Racing drivers